USS Walrus (SS-437), a World War II Tench-class submarine, was the third ship of the United States Navy to be named for the walrus, a gregarious, aquatic mammal found in Arctic waters, related to the seal and a prime source of leather, oil, ivory, and food. Like the second USS Walrus (SS-431), she was not completed.

Walruss keel was laid down on 21 June 1945 by the Electric Boat Company at Groton, Connecticut. Work on the submarine was suspended on 7 January 1946 when the contract for her construction was cancelled, although she was launched on 20 September 1946, sponsored by Miss Winifred P. Nagle.

Walruss hull was assigned to the Atlantic Reserve Fleet, New London Group of the Atlantic Reserve Fleet on 9 December 1952. Her name was stricken from the Naval Vessel Register on 9 June 1958 and she was sold incomplete for scrapping.

References 

Walrus
Cancelled ships of the United States Navy
Ships built in Groton, Connecticut
1946 ships